Jalkaraburra is a genus of Australian intertidal spiders containing the single species, Jalkaraburra alta. It was  first described by V. T. Davies in 1998, and has only been found in Australia.

References

Desidae
Monotypic Araneomorphae genera
Spiders of Australia
Taxa named by Valerie Todd Davies